Sergey Vasilyevich Fesikov (born 21 January 1989) is a Russian professional swimmer. He was part of the Russian 4 × 100 m freestyle relay teams that finished in ninth and third place at the 2008 and 2012 Olympics, respectively.

Career

International Swimming League 
In spring 2020, Fesikov signed for the Toronto Titans, the first Canadian based team in the ISL.

World Championships 
2018: Fesikov took home two silver medals from the 2018 FINA World Swimming Championships in Hangzhou, China, as part of the men's freestyle relay team, one in 4 x 50 m and the other in the 4 x 100 m.

2014: At the 2014 FINA World Swimming Championships in Doha, Fesikov took home two medals. He won gold in the 4 x 50 m freestyle relay and Silver in the 4 x 100 m freestyle relay.

2012: In 2012, at the London Olympic Games, Fesikov helped the Russian team take the podium with bronze for Russia, in the 4 x 100 m freestyle relay.

2010: At the 2010 FINA World Swimming Championships in Dubai, UAE, Fesikov took home three medals: two Silver medals, as part of the men's relay team, in the 4 x 100 m freestyle event and the 4 x 100 m medley event. He also took the bronze in the individual 100 m medley event.

Personal life 
Fesikov's parents are former competitive volleyball players. In the 2000s, his father, a renowned volleyball coach, received various job offers in Yaroslavl and Obninsk and moved his family there from Saint Petersburg. In 2010, Fesikov graduated from the Yaroslavl State University with a degree in social studies. In August 2013 he married Anastasia Zuyeva, an Olympic swimmer who also competed at the 2008 and 2012 Games.

See also
List of Russian records in swimming

References

1989 births
Living people
Russian male medley swimmers
Swimmers at the 2008 Summer Olympics
Swimmers at the 2012 Summer Olympics
Olympic swimmers of Russia
Russian male freestyle swimmers
Olympic bronze medalists for Russia
Olympic bronze medalists in swimming
Medalists at the FINA World Swimming Championships (25 m)
Medalists at the 2012 Summer Olympics
World record holders in swimming
Universiade medalists in swimming
Swimmers from Saint Petersburg
European Aquatics Championships medalists in swimming
Universiade gold medalists for Russia
Universiade bronze medalists for Russia
Medalists at the 2009 Summer Universiade
Medalists at the 2017 Summer Universiade